Ray Norris may refer to:

 Ray Norris (astrophysicist), British-Australian astrophysicist and scholar of Aboriginal astronomy
 Ray Norris (musician) (1916–1958), Canadian guitarist and bandleader